The following lists events that happened during 1947 in Cape Verde.

Incumbents
Colonial governor: João de Figueiredo

Events
 Famine in Cape Verde

References

 
1947 in the Portuguese Empire
Years of the 20th century in Cape Verde
1940s in Cape Verde
Cape Verde
Cape Verde